Gustav Wendling (7 June 1862, Büddenstedt - 17 October 1932, Königslutter) was a German history, landscape and marine painter; associated with the Düsseldorfer Malerschule.

Life and work 
At the age of seventeen, he enrolled at the Kunstakademie Düsseldorf, where he studied landscape painting with Eugen Dücker. From 1884 to 1886, he was Dücker's master student. In the latter year, he went to the United States, to join a group of German painters in Milwaukee who had been commissioned by the American Panorama Company to paint cycloramas and panoramas of the Civil War. A photograph from that period shows him and his fellow artists in front of a cyclorama of the Battle of Chattanooga.

In 1889, together with Heinrich Hermanns, Olof Jernberg, Helmuth Liesegang, August Deusser, Otto Heichert and Arthur Kampf, he helped co-found the "St. Lucas Club", which was opposed to the exhibition practices of the academies and, among other things, sought to revive the art of printmaking. 

For two years, from 1893, Max Clarenbach was his student. In 1895, he was awarded third prize in a competition to design a large mural for the council chamber in Bochum, which he had designed with Friedrich Klein-Chevalier. Originally created for a trade and industrial fair in Düsseldorf, it toured Germany and drew large crowds in Berlin. In his later years, he lived near Braunschweig.

References

Further reading 
 Wendling, Gustav. In: Friedrich von Boetticher, Malerwerke des neunzehnten Jahrhunderts. Beitrag zur Kunstgeschichte. Dresden 1898, Vol.2, pg.996
 "Wendling, Gustav", In: Allgemeines Lexikon der Bildenden Künstler von der Antike bis zur Gegenwart, Vol. 35: Waage–Wilhelmson, E. A. Seemann, Leipzig, 1942
 Heiko Jäckstein: "Gothmund to go – go to Gothmund. Auf Reisen in eine wiederentdeckte Künstlerkolonie", In : Der Wagen 2020/21. Lübecker Beiträge zur Kultur und Gesellschaft,  pp.59–60, 63–66

External links 

 Gustav Wendling by Heiko Jäckstein @ the Künstlerkolonie Gothmund

1862 births
1932 deaths
19th-century German painters
German landscape painters
German marine artists
Kunstakademie Düsseldorf alumni
People from Helmstedt (district)
20th-century German painters